Thomas Wellock (born 1959) is the American historian for the U.S. Nuclear Regulatory Commission.  Trained as both an engineer and a historian, he writes scholarly histories of the regulation of commercial nuclear energy. His most recent book is Safe Enough? A History of Nuclear Power and Accident Risk with the University of California Press in 2021. A review in the New Yorker called Safe Enough? a "refreshingly candid account of how the government . . . approached the bottom-line question posed by the book's title."

Until 2010 he was a Professor in the Department of History at Central Washington University, in Ellensburg, Washington in the United States. In 2007 he received the "CWU Phi Kappa Phi Scholar of the Year" Award. His teaching and research interests include environmental history, western history, recent US history, and political history. He received his Ph.D. in  History from the  University of California, Berkeley in 1995, with a dissertation published as Critical Masses: Opposition to Nuclear Power in California, 1958-1978 Madison: University of Wisconsin Press, 1998. His MA in history is from  the  University of Toledo; his B.S. in mechanical engineering is from the University of Bridgeport.

In 2007, Wellock also published Preserving the Nation: The Conservation and Environmental Movements, 1870-2000.

References

1959 births
Central Washington University faculty
UC Berkeley College of Letters and Science alumni
University of Toledo alumni
University of Bridgeport alumni
Living people
21st-century American historians
21st-century American male writers
Nuclear Regulatory Commission officials
American male non-fiction writers